The Drunk Injuns is an American skate punk band formed in 1983. The band members wear masks that resemble Indian ghost warriors. They claim to believe the masks allow them to channel the spirit world to gain control of their bodies and play better music.

Founding
Vocalist/producer Mörizen Föche originally created and directed Thrasher Magazine'''s Skate Rock'' compilation series, and was ultimately responsible for identifying the musical phenomenon in a series of magazine articles, and is credited with coining the term "Skate Rock". In 1983, MoFo approached the members of the seminal San Jose skate punk band Los Olvidados about forming a new band. MoFo suggested the group don Indian masks.

Members
Mörizen Föche aka MoFo/Restless Spirit (vocals)
Ray Stevens II aka Johnny Yuma (bass)
Mike Fox aka Whölley Smökkes (guitar)
Mike Voss aka Stoned Wolf (guitar)
Matt Etheridge aka Sitting Duck (drums)

Discography

Main albums

Compilations

References

External links
Brief review at Ink19
Brief review at Frances Farmers Revenge
Brief review at In Music We Trust

Alternative Tentacles artists
Punk rock groups from California
Skate punk groups